Andrea Hanak (born 1969 Wolfratshausen) is a German painter.

In 2000, she studied at the Erasmus programme, Ireland.
In 2005, she graduated from Academy of Fine Arts Munich, where she studied with Günther Förg.
She lives and works in Munich.

Awards
2006 Villa Romana prize
2011/12 Förderprogramm zur Chacengleichheit für Frauen in Forschung und Lehre

Exhibitions
2010 "Komm wir gehen", Galerie Matthias Jahn, Munich
2009 "Apokalypse mit Figuren", Andreas Grimm Galerie, Munich
2009 "Der Beweis", Vortrag von Berthold Reiß, Weltraum, Munich 
2007 "Auch das Unnatürliche ist die Natur", Galerie Michael Neff, Frankfurt
2006 Greenberg Van Doren Gallery, New York
2006 Sies + Höke Galerie, Düsseldorf
2005 "Favoriten“, Kunstbau/Lenbachhaus, Munich;  17. Federal Competition, Art and Exhibition Hall of the Federal Republic of Germany, Bonn
2002/03 "Undine renoviert!“, Galerie Royal, Munich
2001 "Märchenwald“, Akademie Galerie, Munich

References

External links
Artist's website
Andrea Hanak

20th-century German painters
21st-century German painters
German women painters
1969 births
Living people
Academy of Fine Arts, Munich alumni
20th-century German women
21st-century German women
Alumni of the Erasmus Programme